Rugiloricus cauliculus is a species of marine animal of the phylum Loricifera and the family Pliciloricidae. The species was described by Higgins & Kristensen in 1986, however other sources such as OBIS indicate that discovery of the species occurred on 19 November 1983.

Distribution  
This species is noted for the coast of Atlantic Ocean of North Carolina, United States.

References

External links 

 Encyclopedia of Life (EOL): Rugiloricus cauliculus
 Integrated Taxonomic Information System (ITIS): Rugiloricus cauliculus  Higgins and Kristensen, 1986 Taxonomic Serial No.: 722193
OBIS: Ocean Biogeographical Information System

Loricifera
Animals described in 1986